Klinger Ridge is an ice-covered ridge south of Martin Peninsula, extending northeast from the Jenkins Heights between McClinton Glacier and Dorchuck Glacier on Bakutis Coast, Marie Byrd Land, Antarctica. It was mapped by the United States Geological Survey from surveys and U.S. Navy aerial photographs, 1959–67, and Landsat imagery, 1972–73. It was named by the Advisory Committee on Antarctic Names after Charles Klinger of the Lockheed Missiles and Space Company, who was Station Scientific Leader and a specialist in aurora photometry at South Pole Station, winter party 1973.

References

Ridges of Marie Byrd Land